Dek or DEK may refer to:
 Dek language
 Dek Island, Ethiopia
 Dek (news), subhead
 Dek, a proposed name for digit 10 (↊) in duodecimal
 DEK (gene), a human gene
 Dek, Qazvin, a village in Iran
 German Evangelical Church Confederation (1922–1933)
 German Evangelical Church in Bohemia, Moravia and Silesia
 Deutsche Einheitskurzschrift, a German stenography system
 Democratic National Party (Cyprus), a Greek Cypriot political party
 Diethyl ketone, a flammable chemical
 Donald Ervin Knuth, an American computer scientist, mathematician, and professor